The Moscow Mathematical Papyrus, also named the Golenishchev Mathematical Papyrus after its first non-Egyptian owner, Egyptologist Vladimir Golenishchev, is an ancient Egyptian mathematical papyrus containing several problems in arithmetic, geometry, and algebra. Golenishchev bought the papyrus in 1892 or 1893 in Thebes. It later entered the collection of the Pushkin State Museum of Fine Arts in Moscow, where it remains today.

Based on the palaeography and orthography of the hieratic text, the text was most likely written down in the 13th Dynasty and based on older material probably dating to the Twelfth Dynasty of Egypt, roughly 1850 BC.

It is a well-known mathematical papyrus, usually referenced together with the Rhind Mathematical Papyrus. The Moscow Mathematical Papyrus is older than the Rhind Mathematical Papyrus, while the latter is the larger of the two.

Exercises contained in the Moscow Papyrus
The problems in the Moscow Papyrus follow no particular order, and the solutions of the problems provide much less detail than those in the Rhind Mathematical Papyrus. The papyrus is well known for some of its geometry problems. Problems 10 and 14 compute a surface area and the volume of a frustum respectively. The remaining problems are more common in nature.

Ship's part problems
Problems 2 and 3 are ship's part problems. One of the problems calculates the length of a ship's rudder and the other computes the length of a ship's mast given that it is 1/3 + 1/5 of the length of a cedar log originally 30 cubits long.

Aha problems

Aha problems involve finding unknown quantities (referred to as aha, "stack") if the sum of the quantity and part(s) of it are given. The Rhind Mathematical Papyrus also contains four of these type of problems. Problems 1, 19, and 25 of the Moscow Papyrus are Aha problems. For instance, problem 19 asks one to calculate a quantity taken 1 and ½ times and added to 4 to make 10. In other words, in modern mathematical notation one is asked to solve .

Pefsu problems
Most of the problems are pefsu problems (see: Egyptian algebra): 10 of the 25 problems. A pefsu measures the strength of the beer made from a hekat of grain 
 

A higher pefsu number means weaker bread or beer. The pefsu number is mentioned in many offering lists. For example, problem 8 translates as:
 (1) Example of calculating 100 loaves of bread of pefsu 20
 (2) If someone says to you: "You have 100 loaves of bread of pefsu 20
 (3) to be exchanged for beer of pefsu 4
 (4) like 1/2  1/4  malt-date beer"
 (5) First calculate the grain required for the 100 loaves of the bread of pefsu 20
 (6) The result is 5 heqat. Then reckon what you need for a des-jug of beer like the beer called 1/2  1/4  malt-date beer
 (7) The result is 1/2  of the heqat measure needed for des-jug of beer made from Upper-Egyptian grain.
 (8) Calculate 1/2  of 5 heqat, the result will be 2 1/2
 (9) Take this 2 1/2  four times
 (10) The result is 10. Then you say to him:
 (11) "Behold! The beer quantity is found to be correct."

Baku problems
Problems 11 and 23 are Baku problems. These calculate the output of workers. Problem 11 asks if someone brings in 100 logs measuring 5 by 5, then how many logs measuring 4 by 4 does this correspond to? Problem 23 finds the output of a shoemaker given that he has to cut and decorate sandals.

Geometry problems
Seven of the twenty-five problems are geometry problems and range from computing areas of triangles, to finding the surface area of a hemisphere (problem 10) and finding the volume of a frustum (a truncated pyramid).

Two geometry problems

Problem 10
The tenth problem of the Moscow Mathematical Papyrus asks for a calculation of the surface area of a hemisphere (Struve, Gillings) or possibly the area of a semi-cylinder (Peet).  Below we assume that the problem refers to the area of a hemisphere.

The text of problem 10 runs like this: "Example of calculating a basket. You are given a basket with a mouth of 4 1/2. What is its surface? Take 1/9 of 9 (since) the basket is half an egg-shell. You get 1. Calculate the remainder which is 8. Calculate 1/9 of 8. You get 2/3 + 1/6 + 1/18. Find the remainder of this 8 after subtracting 2/3 + 1/6 + 1/18. You get 7 + 1/9. Multiply 7 + 1/9 by 4 + 1/2. You get 32. Behold this is its area. You have found it correctly."

The solution amounts to computing the area as 
 

The formula calculates for the area of a hemisphere, where the scribe of the Moscow Papyrus used   to approximate π.

Problem 14: Volume of frustum of square pyramid

The fourteenth problem of the Moscow Mathematical calculates the volume of a frustum.

Problem 14 states that a pyramid has been truncated in such a way that the top area is a square of length 2 units, the bottom a square of length 4 units, and the height 6 units, as shown. The volume is found to be 56 cubic units, which is correct.

The solution to the problem indicates that the Egyptians knew the correct formula for obtaining the volume of a truncated pyramid:

where a and b are the base and top side lengths of the truncated pyramid and h is the height. Researchers have speculated how the Egyptians might have arrived at the formula for the volume of a frustum but the derivation of this formula is not given in the papyrus.

Summary
Richard J. Gillings gave a cursory summary of the Papyrus' contents.  Numbers with overlines denote the unit fraction having that number as denominator, e.g. ; unit fractions were common objects of study in ancient Egyptian mathematics.

Other papyri
Other mathematical texts from Ancient Egypt include:
Berlin Papyrus 6619
Egyptian Mathematical Leather Roll
Lahun Mathematical Papyri
Rhind Mathematical Papyrus

General papyri:
Papyrus Harris I
Rollin Papyrus

For the 2/n tables see:
RMP 2/n table

See also
 List of ancient Egyptian papyri

Notes

References

Full text of the Moscow Mathematical Papyrus
 Struve, Vasilij Vasil'evič, and Boris Turaev. 1930. Mathematischer Papyrus des Staatlichen Museums der Schönen Künste in Moskau. Quellen und Studien zur Geschichte der Mathematik; Abteilung A: Quellen 1. Berlin: J. Springer

Other references
 Allen, Don.  April 2001.  The Moscow Papyrus and Summary of Egyptian Mathematics.
 Imhausen, A., Ägyptische Algorithmen. Eine Untersuchung zu den mittelägyptischen mathematischen Aufgabentexten, Wiesbaden 2003.
 Mathpages.com.  The Prismoidal Formula.
 O'Connor and Robertson, 2000. Mathematics in Egyptian Papyri.
 Truman State University, Math and Computer Science Division.  Mathematics and the Liberal Arts: Ancient Egypt and The Moscow Mathematical Papyrus.
 Williams, Scott W. Mathematicians of the African Diaspora, containing a page on Egyptian Mathematics Papyri.
 Zahrt, Kim R. W. Thoughts on Ancient Egyptian Mathematics .

Egyptian mathematics
Egyptian fractions
Egyptian papyri
Antiquities of the Pushkin Museum
19th century BC in Egypt